The Hübschhorn is a mountain of the Lepontine Alps, overlooking the Simplon Pass in the canton of Valais. It belongs to the Monte Leone massif. Its altitude is 3190m/10'460 ft.

Access roads

The car access is both from Italian and Swiss sides by following the road towards the Simplon pass. The closest cities are Domodossola on the Italian side and Brig on the Swiss side. If you need accommodation on the pass, you have Simplon Hospiz (Hospice du Simplon).

Normal climbing route

To climb Hübschhorn you start walking from the road towards a small lake which is directly below the mountain (Rotelsee). From there continue up by following a hardly visible steep path. You will need around three hours from the road to the summit.

You will be able to see the complete route to Wasenhorn and the glacier route to Breithorn (Simplon), and enjoy the views of the Weissmies group in the south-west direction.

References

External links
 Hübschhorn on Hikr
 Hübschhorn - Route description on Mountains for Everybody

Mountains of the Alps
Three-thousanders of Switzerland
Mountains of Switzerland
Mountains of Valais
Lepontine Alps